The Partito Comunista Politico-Militare (Political-Military Communist Party) (PCPM) is an Italian terrorist organization which came to light in 2007, and is linked to the Red Brigades.

15 members of the PCPM were arrested in a February 2007 raid, including far left extremist Alfredo Davanzo, who had previously been sentenced to 10 years in prison.

References

Terrorism in Italy
Red Brigades
Communist organisations in Italy
Communist terrorism